The large scale land use units of the Taita-Taveta County consists of 21 ranching units, two wildlife sanctuaries and three sisal estates.

Wildlife sanctuaries
Taita Hills Wildlife Sanctuary
LUMO Community Wildlife Sanctuary

Ranches 
 Amaka Ranch
 Bura Ranch
 Choke Ranch
 Dawida Ranch
 Kambanga Ranch
 Kasigau Ranch
 Kishushe Cooperative Ranch
 Kishamba B
 Kutima Ranch
 Lualenyi Private Ranch
 Maungu Ranch
 Mbale Ranch
 Mbulia Ranch
 Mgeno Ranch
 Mramba Ranch
 Mwasui Ranch
 Ndara Ranch: It's a Trust land found on the slopes of the Sagalla hills. Also referred to as "Nyika".
 Oza Ranch
 Rukinga Ranch
 Sagalla Ranch
 Taita Ranch [Taita Private Ranch]
 Wushumbu Ranch

Estates
 Kidai Sisal Estate (not operational)
 Taveta Sisal Estate
 Teita Sisal Estate
 Voi Sisal Estate

References

Agriculture in Kenya
Taita-Taveta County